The fifth series of the renminbi is the current coin and banknote series of the Chinese currency, the renminbi. They were progressively introduced since 1999 and consist of ¥0.1, ¥0.5, and ¥1 coins, and ¥1, ¥5, ¥10, ¥20, ¥50, ¥100 notes. The ¥20 banknote is a new denomination, and was added in this series. All banknotes in this series feature a portrait of Chinese Communist Party chairman Mao Zedong by artist Liu Wenxi.

First (1999) edition
Coins of the first edition replace all 3 values from the previous series, namely ¥0.1, ¥0.5, and ¥1. The Emblem of the People's Republic of China of the previous series has been removed and the title of the state has been replaced by "People's Bank of China". The 1 jiao (¥0.1) coin also shrank in size.

The first edition includes the following coins:

The first edition includes the following banknotes:

Remark
 The ¥1 note, introduced on July 30, 2004, can also be argued as a member of the second edition because it shares similar new security features that are introduced in the banknotes of the second (2005) edition.

The new banknotes incorporate several measures to foil counterfeiting, including watermarks and inks that fluoresce under ultraviolet light. All but the ¥1 banknote have a metallic strip, and the ¥50 and ¥100 banknotes also feature numbers which change colour when viewed from different angles. The portrayals of different leaders on the ¥100 banknote, and of different nationalities of China, represented by two people in ethnic dress on the front of previous banknotes, have also been uniformly replaced with the image of Chinese Communist Party chairman Mao Zedong.

Second (2005) edition

The 2005 edition was introduced on August 31, 2005, with the following banknotes and coins:
 banknotes: ¥5, ¥10, ¥20, ¥50, ¥100
 coins: ¥0.1

There is no difference in the basic color and design between the banknotes of the 1999 and 2005 edition. However, new security (anti-counterfeit) features are added in the 2005 edition that distinguishes the two. The differences as compared to the 1999 edition are:
 Dated 2005
 The currency number at the bottom of the reverse is added with “YUAN” indicating the pinyin of the unit (圓) in the Chinese language.
 Added EURion constellation to deter computer-aided counterfeiting
 Removal of fibre threads
 Removal of the second set of serial number on ¥50 and ¥100 banknotes
 Prominent raised ink printing on the right side of obverse

The material of the new ¥0.1 coin is stainless steel, rather than duralumin (an aluminum alloy).

The second edition includes the following coin:

The second edition includes the following banknotes:

Third (2015, 2019, 2020) edition
A new 2015 edition was introduced on November 12, 2015, for the ¥100 banknote. The new edition includes:
 Date of printing (2015)
 Raised ink printing on the right side of the observe replaced with raised printing on the Great Hall of the People (reverse)
 Metallic strip replaced by a visible and colour-shifting security thread, placed on the reverse side of the note
 Restoration of the second (vertical) serial number
 Colour-shifting currency number at bottom-right of the obverse moved to the larger currency number at center of the obverse side of the note

The new 2019 edition of the fifth series of the renminbi was introduced on April 29, 2019, and was issued into general circulation on August 30, 2019, with the following banknotes and coins:
 banknotes: ¥1, ¥10, ¥20, ¥50
 coins: ¥0.1, ¥0.5, ¥1

A new 2020 edition was also introduced on July 8, 2020, for the ¥5 banknote, and was issued into general circulation on November 5, 2020.

The new design is similar to the banknotes of the 1999 and 2005 edition, with some changes made to the printing patterns of both bills and coins. Officials at the People's Bank of China also told the press that the latest issuance does not include a new 5-yuan note, which is being tested for new printing technologies in a bid to reduce counterfeiting of the Chinese currency.

The new ¥1 coin has been narrowed into 22.25 mm, 2.75 mm less than before. Also, the new ¥0.5 coin contains eight isometric serrations with the coin's color becoming nickel instead of golden yellow inside, and the inner edge of the coin is changed into a polygon from circle.

The third edition includes the following coins:

The third edition includes the following banknotes:

References

External links

 Pictures of the 4th and 5th series at ChinaToday.com

Coins of China
Banknotes of China
Renminbi
Currencies introduced in 1999
Chinese numismatics